Jane Elizabeth Leslie, 12th Countess of Rothes (5 May 1750 – 1810) was a Scottish noblewoman.

She was the daughter of John Leslie, 10th Earl of Rothes and his first wife Hannah  Howard, daughter of Matthew Howard of Thorp, Norfolk, and his wife Britannia Cole. She succeeded her brother, John Leslie, 11th Earl of Rothes, in 1773 in the peerage and estates of Rothes, and effectually vindicated her right to the estates against the claim of her uncle Andrew Leslie, both in the Court of Session and the House of Lords.

She was twice married, first in 1766, to George Raymond Evelyn, youngest son of William Evelyn Glanville of St Clere, Kent, and secondly, in 1772, to Sir Lucas Pepys, 1st Baronet, an eminent physician and uncle of the first Earl of Cottenham. By both marriages she had issue, and dying in 1810, was succeeded by the only surviving son of her first marriage, George William, 13th Earl of Rothes.

References

Bibliography

1750 births
1810 deaths
18th-century Scottish women
12
Hereditary women peers
Wives of baronets